Anwar Shaikh may refer to:
 Anwar Shaikh (critic of Islam) (1928–2006), British India-born British writer
 Anwar Shaikh (economist) (born 1945), Pakistani American heterodox economist